Miami-Dade Arena (known as American Airlines Arena from 1999 to 2021, and FTX Arena from 2021 to 2023) is a multi-purpose arena located in Miami, Florida, along Biscayne Bay. It was constructed beginning in 1998 as a replacement for the Miami Arena and designed by the architecture firms Arquitectonica and 360 Architecture. The arena is home to the Miami Heat of the National Basketball Association.

The arena is directly served by the Miami Metrorail at Government Center station via free transfers to Metromover Omni Loop, providing direct service to Freedom Tower and Park West stations. The arena is also within walking distance from the Historic Overtown/Lyric Theatre Metrorail station.

The arena has 2,105 club seats, 80 luxury suites, and 76 private boxes.  The Waterfront Theater, Florida's largest theater, is housed within the arena and seats between 3,000 and 5,800 patrons. The theater can be configured for concerts, family events, musical theatre and other stage shows. American Airlines, which has a hub at Miami International Airport, maintains a travel center at the venue.

In September 2019, it was reported that the arena would have a new name in 2020. In March 2021, FTX, a cryptocurrency exchange, acquired the naming rights to the arena for $135 million. The NBA approved the deal in early April, and the arena was fully renamed to FTX Arena in June 2021. 

In November 2022, following the bankruptcy of FTX, the naming rights deal for the arena was terminated with Miami–Dade County, and the Heat are seeking to strip the FTX branding off the arena and find a new naming rights partner as soon as legally possible. The naming rights deal was fully terminated as of January 11, 2023.

History
Miami-Dade Arena opened as the American Airlines Arena on December 31, 1999, and its construction cost was $213 million. Architectural design team members included George Heinlein, Cristian Petschen, Reinaldo Borges, and Lance Simon. The arena's opening was inaugurated with a concert by Gloria Estefan.  Two days later, on January 2, 2000, the Miami Heat played its first game in the new arena by defeating the Orlando Magic 111–103.

As part of its sponsorship arrangement, American Airlines had a giant aircraft painted atop the arena's roof, with an American Airlines logo in the center. The design is visible from airplanes taking off and landing at Miami International Airport, where American has a hub. The arena also has luxury skyboxes called "Flagship Lounges", a trademark originally used for American's premium-class lounges at certain airports.

Local sportscasters often referred to the arena as the "Triple-A". Some sports reporters on the local news stations such as WSVN have referred to the arena as "A3" (A cubed). The arena is known for its unusual scoreboard, designed by artist Christopher Janney. Drawing on the underwater anemone forms, the scoreboard also changes colors depending on the atmosphere. For concerts in an arena configuration, end stage capacity is 12,202 for 180° shows, 15,402 for 270° shows, and 18,309 for 360° shows. For center stage concerts the arena can seat 19,146.

The Miami Heat has not had to pay to use the $357 million venue, which sits on $38 million of county land; the county has paid $64 million in operating subsidies. "It was never a good deal," says former Miami-Dade Commissioner Katy Sorenson, who opposed the new arena in 1996. "There are certain politicians who just get stars in their eyes and don't really think about what the real cost is going to be."

WTVJ, the city's NBC owned-and-operated station in Miami, had their Downtown Miami Studios in the back of the arena from 2001 till 2011.

On September 10, 2019, it was reported that American Airlines said that it would not renew its naming rights upon expiration at the end of 2019. The new naming rights contract with a sponsor, which at that time had yet to be determined, would be a ten-year/six-month deal lasting from January 1, 2020, to June 30, 2030 (to time with the end of the 2029–30 NBA season). , the naming rights had not been sold, and the arena continued to use the American Airlines Arena name. The American Airlines Arena court decals were removed from the Heat's floor before the 2020–21 season and replaced temporarily with the logo of team/league vehicle sponsor Kia Motors. In March 2021, FTX, a cryptocurrency exchange platform, acquired the naming rights to the arena for $135 million. The NBA approved the deal in early April, and the new name of FTX Arena was fully adopted in June 2021, just after the Miami Heat were swept by the Milwaukee Bucks in the first round of the 2021 NBA playoffs.

On November 11, 2022, FTX, along with nearly 200 related companies, filed for Chapter 11 bankruptcy in Delaware. Later that same day, the Miami Heat, along with Miami-Dade County, announced that they were terminating all affiliations with FTX, and plan to find a new naming rights partner for the arena. The FTX Arena name was officially terminated on January 11, 2023. The communications team for Miami mayor Daniella Levine Cava announced that until FTX branding is removed and a new naming rights sponsor is selected, the stadium would simply be known as "Miami-Dade Arena."

Accessibility

Transportation
The Arena is in walking distance of Freedom Tower Metromover station.

Parking on-site
The arena features 939 parking spaces, with those spaces reserved for premium seat and Dewar's 12 Clubhouse ticket holders during Heat games. ParkJockey manages the arena's on-site parking.

Notable events

Basketball

 The then named American Airlines Arena along with the American Airlines Center in Dallas, hosted the 2006 NBA Finals and the 2011 NBA Finals as the Miami Heat played the Dallas Mavericks. The Heat won the championship in 2006 in Dallas and the Mavericks won in the 2011 rematch in Miami. These series were the first and second appearances in the NBA Finals for both franchises. As the airline held the naming rights to both venues then, people nicknamed the matchups as the "American Airlines series".
 The arena hosted the 2012, 2013 and 2014 NBA Finals along with the Chesapeake Energy Arena in Oklahoma City in 2012, and the AT&T Center in San Antonio in 2013 and 2014. In 2012, the Heat defeated the Oklahoma City Thunder in five games, winning the championship at home. In 2013, the Heat played the San Antonio Spurs. The Heat faced a 3–2 series deficit returning to Miami but won games 6 and 7 to defend their championship. In 2014, the Spurs defeated the Heat in five games in San Antonio and won the championship and the rematch.
Since 2015, the arena has hosted the annual Hoophall Miami Invitational, an NCAA Division I college basketball showcase event.

Professional wrestling
The arena hosted the WCW Uncensored pay-per-view in 2000. Four major WWE pay-per-view events have been held at the arena: the Royal Rumble in 2006, Survivor Series in 2007 and 2010, and Hell in a Cell in 2013. It has also hosted various episodes of Raw and SmackDown.

Ringling Bros. Circus
On January 14, 2017 Feld Entertainment Inc. held a private company meeting at the then American Airlines Arena to announce the closure of Ringling Brothers Barnum and Bailey Circus. Employees of the "Greatest Show on Earth" were informed earlier in the day that a "special meeting" would be held following the final performance of the day in Miami. At approx 10:30pm, employees gathered in a top floor suite at the arena to be addressed by CEO Kenneth Feld. During this meeting, both company employees and the press were informed for the first time that the circus would close after 146 years of operation. The following day, the circus shattered attendance records, performing three sold out shows before leaving Miami in the early hours of Monday, January 16, 2017. A frenzy of press gathered inside and outside of the arena to document what was, by this time, international breaking news.

Other sports
The arena also hosted the first UFC event in the state of Florida, UFC 42: Sudden Impact, on April 25, 2003.
The arena features a regulation NHL ice rink, though the arena has never hosted the sport, as the Florida Panthers have played in Sunrise at the FLA Live Arena since October 1998. The rink, lined with a smaller wall, instead accommodates ice shows such as Disney on Ice.
The Waterfront Theatre at the arena hosted the 2020 NFL Honors on February 1, 2020, which was broadcast on Fox.

Music

Phish, the American rock band from Vermont, has performed at the arena 12 times, including 3 sold-out shows on New Year's Eve. (2003, 2009, 2014)
Dua Lipa performed at the arena for her Future Nostalgia Tour on February 9, 2022.
Mariah Carey performed here as part of her Rainbow World Tour on March 29, 2000.
On November 7–8, 2002, Cher's Living Proof: The Farewell Tour performed at the arena for an NBC special, which aired in April 2003, winning an Emmy Award.
Kelly Clarkson and Clay Aiken performed at the arena as part of their Independent Tour on February 28, 2004.
On March 28, 2004, Britney Spears performed to a sold-out show as part of The Onyx Hotel Tour. The show was broadcast live over the world. She performed as part of her The Circus Starring Britney Spears Tour at the arena on March 7, 2009, and set an attendance record with a sold-out crowd of 18,644, beating out Celine Dion who previously gathered a 17,725 crowd. It is noted as the largest concert attendance in the arena's history . She also  performed at the arena for the Femme Fatale Tour on July 22, 2011.
The 2004 MTV Video Music Awards and 2005 MTV Video Music Awards were held at the arena.
The arena was the setting for the highly publicized MTV Video Music Awards, both in 2004 and 2005. Both events brought millions of dollars into the Miami-Dade County economy.
U2 brought their award-winning Vertigo Tour to Miami on November 13 and 14, 2005. 
Shakira performed in the arena as part of her Tour of the Mongoose for the first time on December 2, 2002. Four years later, she performed in the arena on September 15 and 16, 2006, as part of her Oral Fixation Tour and returned for three more shows (December 7, 8 and 9, 2006), where the DVD footage of the concert was filmed. With 5 shows together, this makes the Colombian singer obtaining the most sold-out shows in the arena as a female artist. She brought her The Sun Comes Out World Tour to the arena again on September 27, 2010. Eight years later, she returned to the arena with El Dorado World Tour on August 17 and 18, 2018.
On December 4–5, 2007, the Argentine rock band Soda Stereo performed at the arena as part of their comeback tour Me Verás Volver, being this tour a sellout in Argentina and the Americas. It was six sold-out shows in the famous Estadio Monumental Antonio Vespucio Liberti.
The arena was host to For Darfur benefit concert, which was the Miami stop for Kanye West's Glow in the Dark Tour, on May 6, 2008.
Tina Turner performed at the arena as a part of her Tina!: 50th Anniversary Tour on October 30, 2008. 
Celine Dion performed at the arena as a part of her Taking Chances Tour on January 23, 2009, and set an attendance record making it the largest crowd in the arena's history. Dion will return to the arena on January 17 and 18, 2020 as part of her Courage World Tour.
The cast of Mexican hit TV series Two Faces of Love beat out Britney Spears selling out a crowd of 18,693 making this the largest concert attendance in the arena's history, .
Justin Bieber performed five sold-out shows at the arena. He performed at the arena on December 18, 2010, during his My World Tour. He performed at the arena two years later during his Believe Tour and performed two sold-out shows on January 26 and 27, 2013. He returned to the arena and performed two-sold-out shows during his Purpose World Tour on July 2 and 3, 2016. He will return to the arena for his Justice World Tour on April 13, 2022.
Lady Gaga performed at the arena for The Monster Ball Tour to a sold-out crowd of 14,695 on April 13, 2011, and was scheduled return as part of her Born This Way Ball Tour on March 16, 2013, but cancelled, not only this show but the entire rest of the tour, due to a hip injury.
Coldplay performed a sold-out show at the arena on June 29, 2012 as part of their Mylo Xyloto Tour.
Jennifer Lopez performed at the arena on August 31 and September 1, 2012, to two sold-out crowds as part of her Dance Again World Tour along with the help of Enrique Iglesias. She also performed here on July 25, 26 and 27, 2019 for her It's My Party Tour.
Madonna performed at the arena on November 19–20, 2012 as part of The MDNA Tour. The sold-out shows were filmed for a DVD, entitled MDNA World Tour.
Miley Cyrus performed three sold-out concerts in the arena, as a part of her Best of Both Worlds Tour on January 31, 2008, Wonder World Tour on December 2, 2009, and Bangerz Tour on March 22, 2014.
Kanye West performed at the arena during his Saint Pablo Tour on September 16–17, 2016.
Australian worship band Hillsong United recorded a two-hour long live CD/DVD set, entitled Hillsong United: Live in Miami, which was released in August 2011, which was filmed, recorded and played at the arena in front of a sold-out audience.
One Direction performed a sold-out show at the arena on June 14, 2013, as part of their Take Me Home Tour.
Indoor electronic dance music event Sensation took place at the arena on October 11–12, 2013.
Katy Perry performed a sold-out show at the arena as part of The Prismatic World Tour on July 3, 2014. She returned to the arena as part of her Witness: The Tour on December 20, 2017.
Demi Lovato performed at the arena as part of her Demi World Tour on September 14, 2014; they returned during their Tell Me You Love Me World Tour on March 30, 2018.
Ariana Grande performed at the arena as part of The Honeymoon Tour on March 28, 2015. She also performed at the arena for the Dangerous Woman Tour on April 14, 2017. She also performed at the arena on May 31 and June 1, 2019, then again on November 27, 2019, as part of the  Sweetener World Tour
Chris Brown performed at the arena during his One Hell Of a Nite Tour on September 3, 2015.
Janet Jackson performed at the arena as part of Unbreakable World Tour on September 20, 2015. She performed again on August 5, 2018, as part of her State of the World Tour and was scheduled to return on June 24, 2020, as the opening night by her Black Diamond World Tour but the show was cancelled due to the COVID-19 pandemic.
Taylor Swift performed at the arena for her Speak Now World Tour on November 13, 2011. Two years later she performed at the arena for The Red Tour on April 10, 2013. She returned to the arena as part of The 1989 World Tour on October 27, 2015, the one year anniversary of the release of her studio album, 1989.
The Weeknd performed a show at the arena as part of The Madness Fall Tour on December 19, 2015.
Rihanna performed a show at the arena on March 15, 2016, as a part of her Anti World Tour.
Selena Gomez performed at the arena as part of her Revival Tour on June 11, 2016.
Maroon 5 performed a show at the arena as part of their Maroon V Tour on September 7, 2016.
Adele performed two sold-out concerts at the arena as part of her Adele Live 2016 tour on October 25–26, 2016.
Carrie Underwood headlined the arena for the first time on February 2, 2023 during her Denim & Rhinestones Tour with supporting act Jimmie Allen.

Awards ceremonies

The Miami-Dade Arena is the home of the annual Premio Lo Nuestro Latin music awards since 2001. The awards are held on a Thursday night in late February.

Gallery

References

External links

Satellite view from Google Maps

1999 establishments in Florida
Basketball venues in Florida
Boxing venues in the United States
Leadership in Energy and Environmental Design certified buildings
Miami Heat venues
Miami Sol venues
Mixed martial arts venues in Florida
Music venues completed in 1999
Music venues in Florida
National Basketball Association venues
Sports venues completed in 1999
Sports venues in Miami
Tourist attractions in Miami
Arquitectonica buildings